The 2010 National Women's Football Championship was the 6th season of the National Women Football Championship, the top-tier of women's football in Pakistan. The event took place from 28 September to 10 October 2010 at Jinnah Sports Stadium in Islamabad.

Young Rising Stars were able to won their second National Championship by beating WAPDA 2–0 in the final, courtesy of goals from Malika-e-Noor and Asma Yaseen

References

National Women Football Championship seasons
W1
W1
Pakistan
Pakistan